Central Sierra Miwok is a Miwok language spoken in California, in the upper Stanislaus and Tuolumne valleys. Today it is spoken by the Chicken Ranch Rancheria of Me-Wuk Indians of California, a federally recognized tribe of Central Sierra Miwoks.

Phonology
With the orthography of the 1960 dictionary, the sounds of Central Sierra Miwok are,

In later transcription, /j/ was written  and /ɨ/ . Long vowels are written  etc.

Notes

External links 

Central Sierra Miwok test

 Central Sierra Miwok wiktionary incubator test
 Central Sierra Miwok Dictionary with Texts (1960), by L. S. Freeland and Sylvia M. Broadbent
 Southern Sierra Miwok, California Language Archive
 Metathesis, Sierra Miwok
 Central Sierra Miwok basic lexicon at the Global Lexicostatistical Database
 Central Sierra Miwok at the Survey of California and Other Indian Languages
 OLAC resources in and about the Central Sierra Miwok language

Utian languages
Miwok